The Strelna is a river in the south of the Kola Peninsula in Murmansk Oblast, Russia. The Strelna originates on the Keivy and flows into the White Sea. Its biggest tributary is the Beryozovaya.

References

Rivers of Murmansk Oblast
Drainage basins of the White Sea